Henry Winslow Barnes (November 2, 1818September 1, 1873) was an American farmer, Democratic politician, and Wisconsin pioneer.  He was a member of the Wisconsin State Assembly, representing Lafayette County in the 1857, 1870, and 1871 sessions.

Biography
Henry W. Barnes was born in Bedford, New Hampshire, in November 1818.  His father died when he was just seven years old.  He came to the Wisconsin Territory in 1835, when he was just 17.  He initially resided at Darlington, and was elected to the Lafayette County board of supervisors from Darlington in 1849.  In the early 1850s he moved to the neighboring town of Wiota, Wisconsin, and was quickly elected chairman of the town board, serving from 1851 to 1859.  During the same years, he was elected to six consecutive terms representing Wiota on the county board—from 1853 through 1858.  He was also chosen as chairman of the county board in 1855.

In 1856, Barnes was elected on the Democratic Party ticket to serve in the Wisconsin State Assembly.  He represented Lafayette County's 2nd Assembly district, which then comprised roughly the eastern half of the county.  In 1858, he was elected clerk of the circuit court for Lafayette County, for a two year term, and he was then elected sheriff in 1860.

He was elected to two more terms in the Assembly, in 1869 and 1870, when he again represented Lafayette County's 2nd Assembly district.  He then serve two final terms on the county board in 1871 and 1872.

Barnes died at his home in Wiota on September 1, 1873, after a long and painful illness.

Personal life and family
Henry Winslow Barnes was the youngest of eight children born to Nathaniel Barnes and his wife Anna ( Rennick).  Nathaniel Barnes was a captain in the New Hampshire militia, and had served as a selectman and constable in Bedford.  The Barnes family were descended from Thomas Barnes, who emigrated from Hingham, Norfolk, to the Massachusetts Bay Colony in 1637.

Isaac O. Barnes was an older brother of Henry Winslow Barnes.  He was a prominent lawyer and Democratic politician in Boston. He held the rank of colonel by appointment, and was appointed to several federal posts in Massachusetts, serving as a customs official, U.S. marshal, and finally U.S. pension agent.

Electoral history

Wisconsin Assembly (1869, 1870)

| colspan="6" style="text-align:center;background-color: #e9e9e9;"| General Election, November 2, 1869

| colspan="6" style="text-align:center;background-color: #e9e9e9;"| General Election, November 8, 1870

References

1818 births
1873 deaths
People from Bedford, New Hampshire
People from Darlington, Wisconsin
People from Wiota, Wisconsin
Wisconsin city council members
Democratic Party members of the Wisconsin State Assembly
Wisconsin sheriffs
County supervisors in Wisconsin
19th-century American politicians
Wisconsin pioneers